Primorsko Airfield  is an airfield in Primorsko, Bulgaria.
The airfield was built in 2003. It is located 5 km west of Primorsko near the village of Yasna polyana.

References

External links
 Photos capture on Primorsko airfield

Airports in Bulgaria